Nataša Vezmar (born October 24, 1976 in Bjelovar) is a Croatian taekwondo practitioner, who competed in the women's heavyweight category. One of Croatia's most prominent sporting figures in her decade, Vezmar held three European titles in the over-72 kg division, claimed two medals (a silver and a bronze) at the World Taekwondo Championships (1997 and 2003), and represented her nation Croatia in two editions of the Olympic Games (2000 and 2004). Vezmar also trained full-time for TK Metalac in Zagreb, under head coach and master Ivica Klaić.

Vezmar made her official debut at the 2000 Summer Olympics in Sydney, where she competed in the women's over-67 kg class. Seeded second and one of the fighters predicted to get an Olympic medal, Vezmar started her fight with an impressive 7–4 victory over Spain's Ireane Ruíz, before losing the semifinal to her Russian opponent Natalia Ivanova. In the repechage, Vezmar thrashed Mounia Bourguigue of Morocco at 4–1 to mount her chances of an Olympic medal. In the bronze medal match, Vezmar scored a 4–4 draw in the first two rounds against Dominique Bosshart, but her Canadian opponent responded with a feverish kicking exchange at the end to seal a seamless 11–8 victory, relegating Vezmar to fourth.

In 2003, Vezmar picked up a silver medal in the same category at the World Championships in Garmisch-Partenkirchen, Germany, following a tough 1–0 defeat to South Korea's Youn Hyun-jung.

At the 2004 Summer Olympics in Athens, Vezmar qualified for her second Croatian squad in the women's heavyweight class (+67 kg). Earlier in the process, she defeated Great Britain's Sarah Stevenson in the final to secure her place on the Croatian team at the European Olympic Qualification Tournament in Baku, Azerbaijan. Hoping to improve her fourth-place finish from Sydney, Vezmar moved directly into the quarterfinals with a first round bye, but rounded off a dismal display in a startling 4–5 defeat to 16-year-old Jordanian teen Nadin Dawani.  With her opponent losing the semifinal to France's Myriam Baverel, Vezmar failed to slip into the repechage bracket for a chance of an Olympic bronze medal.

References

External links

1976 births
Living people
Croatian female taekwondo practitioners
Olympic taekwondo practitioners of Croatia
Taekwondo practitioners at the 2000 Summer Olympics
Taekwondo practitioners at the 2004 Summer Olympics
Sportspeople from Bjelovar
European Taekwondo Championships medalists
World Taekwondo Championships medalists